The 1976 Florida Gators football team represented the University of Florida during the 1976 NCAA Division I football season. The season was the seventh for Doug Dickey as the head coach of the Florida Gators football team.  Dickey's 1976 Florida Gators finished with an 8–4 overall record and a 4–2 record in the Southeastern Conference (SEC), placing fourth among ten SEC teams.

Schedule

Primary source: 2015 Florida Gators Football Media Guide

Attendance figures: 1977 University of Florida Press Guide.

Personnel

References

Florida
Florida Gators football seasons
Florida Gators football